Eois obada is a moth in the family Geometridae first described by Herbert Druce in 1892. It is found in Mexico and Panama.

Subspecies
Eois obada obada (Mexico)
Eois obada transsecta (Warren, 1901) (Panama)

References

Moths described in 1892
Eois
Moths of North America